This List of Naïve art artists is a list of artists who are known for their works in naïve art.

18th century 

Oluf Braren (1787–1839)
Justus DaLee (1793–1878)
Edward Hicks (1780–1849)
Joshua Johnson (1763–1824)

19th century 

James Bard (1815–1897)
Ferdinand Cheval, known as 'le facteur Cheval' (1836–1924)
Denys Corbet (1826–1910)
Olof Krans (1838–1916)
Cándido López (1840–1902)
Niko Pirosmani (1862–1918) Georgia
Peter Rindisbacher (1806–1834) USA, born in Switzerland
Henri Rousseau (1844–1910) France

20th century 

Gesner Abelard (born 1922)
Ellinor Aiki (1893–1969)
Andreas Alariesto (1900–1989) Finland
Alyona Azernaya (born 1966) Russia
Jan Bacur (born 1937) Serbia
Jan Balet (1913–2009)
Nina Barka (Marie Smirsky) (1908–1986)
Ilija Bašičević (1895–1972)
André Bauchant (1873–1958)
Kateryna Bilokur (1900–1961) Ukraine
Janko Brašić (1906–1994)
Camille Bombois (1883–1970)
Frédéric Bruly Bouabré (born 1923)
Eugen Buktenica (1914–1997) Croatia
Sam Byrne (1883–1978) Australia
Charles Callins (1887–1982)
Zuzana Chalupová (1925–2001) Kovačica (Vojvodina) Serbia
Paulina Constancia (born 1970) Philippines
Henry Darger (1892–1973)
Michel Delacroix (born 1933) France
Préfète Duffaut (born 1923)
Emerik Feješ (1904–1969) Croatia
Howard Finster (1916–2001)
Robert-Émile Fortin (1945–2004) Canada
Lucy Fradkin (born 1953) United States
George Fredericks (born 1929)
José Rodríguez Fuster (born 1946) Cuba
Dragan Gaži (1930–1983) Croatia
Ivan Generalić (1914–1992) Hlebine, Croatia
Josip Generalić (1935–2004) Hlebine, Croatia
Mokarrameh Ghanbari (1928–2005) Iran
Petronėlė Gerlikienė (1905–1979)
Petar Grgec (1933–2006) Croatia
Theora Hamblett (1895–1977)
James Hampton (1909–1964), United States
Krsto Hegedušić (1901–1975) Croatia
Jan Husarik (born 1942) Padina, Serbia
Eremenko Irina (1919–2007) Russia
Mary Jewels (1886–1977)
Daniel Johnston (1961–2019) Austin, United States
Drago Jurak (1911–1994) Croatia
Bob Justin (born 1941)
Ferenc Kalmar (born 1928)
John Kane (1860–1934)
Alena Kish (1889 or 1896–1949) Belarus
Mijo Kovačić (born 1935) Croatia
Arnold Kramer (1882–1976)
Siegfried L. Kratochwil (1916–2005) Austria
Ivan Lacković Croata (1932–2004) Croatia
Pavel Leonov (1920–2011) Russia
Maud Lewis (1903–1970) Canada
Antonio Ligabue (1899–1965)
Séraphine Louis, known as 'Séraphine de Senlis' (1864–1942)
Claudine Loquen, (born 1965) France 
L. S. Lowry (1887–1976)
Manuel Lepe Macedo (1936–1984)
Radia Bent Lhoucine (1912–1994)
Ferreira Louis Marius (born 1953)
Katya Medvedeva (born 1937) Russia
Martin Mehkek (1936–2014) Croatia
Manuel Mendive (born 1944) Cuba
Dobrosav Milojevic (born 1948) Serbia
Ethel Wright Mohamed (1906–1992) United States
Grandma Moses, Anna Mary Robertson (1860–1961)
Franjo Mraz (1910–1981) Hlebine, Croatia
Navitrolla (born 1970) Estonia
Radi Nedelchev (born 1938) Bulgaria
Norman Neasom (1915–2010)
Nikifor (1895–1968) Poland
Mary Nohl (1914–2001) Fox Point, Wisconsin
Teofil Ociepka (1891–1978) Poland
Stan Ioan Pătraş (1908–1977) Romania
Bryan Pearce (1929–2007)
Mario Perez (born 1943)
Raphael Perez (born 1965) Israel
Dominique-Paul Peyronnet (1872–1943) France
Nan Phelps (1904–1990) United States
Horace Pippin (1888–1946)
Maria Pryimachenko (1908–1997) Ukraine
Alevtina Pyzhova (born 1936) Russia
Ivan Rabuzin (1921–2008) Croatia
Polina Raiko (1927–2004) Ukraine
Bárbaro Rivas (1893–1967) Venezuela
Markey Robinson (1918–1999) Ireland
Konstantin Rodko (1908–1995)
Vasily Romanenkov (1953–2013) Russia
Heinz Seelig (1909–1992) Israel
Oles Semernya (1936–2012) Ukraine
Jon Serl (1894–1993) United States
Jean Pierre Serrier (1934-1989) France
Yeshayahu Sheinfeld (1909–1979) Israel
Mary Michael Shelley (born 1950)
Chris (Simpsons artist) (born 1983) England
Matija Skurjeni (1898–1990) Croatia
Petar Smajić (1910–1985) Croatia
Peter Smith (born 1967)
Slavko Stolnik (1929–1991) Croatia
Bunleua Sulilat (1932–1996)
Dragiša Stanisavljević (born 1921)
Henry Stockley (1892–1982), Great Britain
Chaibia Talal (1929–2004)
Lavoslav Torti (1875–1942) Croatia
Bracha Turner (1922–2011)
Ivan Večenaj (1920–2013) Croatia
Guido Vedovato (born 1961) Italy
Arthur Villeneuve (1910–1990) Canada
Mirko Virius (1889–1943) Croatia
Miguel García Vivancos (1895–1972)
Louis Vivin (1861–1936)
Elena Volkova (1915–2013)
Alfred Wallis (1855–1942)
Scottie Wilson (1890–1972)
Fred Yates (1922–2008)
Sergey Zagraevsky (1964–2020) Russia

See also 
 Lists of artists#Lists of artists by discipline

References 

Naïve art
Lists of artists